Straight Ahead is an album by American jazz vocalist Abbey Lincoln featuring performances recorded in 1961 for the Candid label.

Reception
The AllMusic review by Scott Yanow awarded the album 5 stars and stated that "this is one of Abbey Lincoln's greatest recordings".

Track listing
 "Straight Ahead" (Abbey Lincoln, Earl Baker, Mal Waldron) — 5:24 
 "When Malindy Sings" (Oscar Brown, Paul Lawrence Dunbar) — 4:05 
 "In the Red" (Chips Bayen, Abbey Lincoln, Max Roach) — 8:32 
 "Blue Monk" (Abbey Lincoln, Thelonious Monk) — 6:39 
 "Left Alone" (Billie Holiday, Mal Waldron) — 6:48 
 "African Lady" (Langston Hughes, Randy Weston) — 3:46 
 "Retribution" (Abbey Lincoln, Julian Priester) — 3:50 
Recorded at Nola Penthouse Studios in New York City on February 22, 1961

Personnel
Abbey Lincoln — vocals
Booker Little — trumpet
Julian Priester — trombone
Eric Dolphy — alto saxophone, bass clarinet, flute, piccolo
Walter Benton — tenor saxophone
Coleman Hawkins — tenor saxophone
Mal Waldron — piano
Art Davis — bass
Max Roach — drums
Roger Sanders, Robert Whitley — congas

References

Candid Records albums
Abbey Lincoln albums
1961 albums
Albums produced by Nat Hentoff